Bardo Pond is the 8th studio album by Bardo Pond, released in 2010.

Track listing

Just Once - 7:19   
Don't Know About You - 4:27   
Sleeping - 8:38   
Undone - 21:02   
Cracker Wrist - 9:00   
Await The Star (titled "The Stars Behind" on digital releases of the album) - 12:59   
Wayne's Tune - 15:52

Personnel
Isobel Sollenberger - Flute, Violin, Vocals
Michael Gibbons - Guitar
John Gibbons - Guitar
Clint Takeda - Bass
Jason Kourkounis - Drums
Aaron Igler - Synthesizer, Electronics

References

2010 albums
Bardo Pond albums
Fire Records (UK) albums